Capitol Hill is a neighborhood of Washington, D.C., adjacent to the United States Capitol.

Capitol Hill may also refer to:

Australia
 Capital Hill, Australian Capital Territory, the location of Parliament House in Canberra

Canada
 Capitol Hill, Burnaby, a hill and neighborhood in Burnaby, British Columbia
 Capitol Hill, Calgary, a neighborhood in Calgary, Alberta
 Capitol Hill Music, a Canadian record label

Northern Mariana Islands
 Capitol Hill, Saipan, the location of the seat of government of the Northern Mariana Islands

United States
 A metonym for the United States Capitol or the United States Congress
 Capitol Hill, Denver, a neighborhood of Denver, Colorado
 Capitol Hill, New Jersey, a neighborhood of Edgewater Park, New Jersey
 Capitol Hill, Oklahoma City, a neighborhood in Oklahoma City, Oklahoma
 Capitol Hill, an area of West Portland Park, Portland, Oregon, a neighborhood
 Capitol Hill, Salt Lake City, a hill and neighborhood in Salt Lake City, Utah
 Capitol Hill, Seattle, a neighborhood of Seattle, Washington
Capitol Hill Autonomous Zone, a self-declared autonomous zone in Capitol Hill, Seattle
 Capitol Hill station, a train station serving the neighborhood

See also
 Capital Hill (disambiguation)
 Capitoline Hill, the original Capitol Hill in Rome, Italy
 Parliament Hill (disambiguation)